Local Boys is a 2002 American coming-of-age drama film. The film was directed by Ron Moler and written by Norman Douglas Bradley and Thomas Matthew Stewart. The film stars Jeremy Sumpter and Eric Christian Olsen as two brothers who face new challenges and adventures over the course of a memorable summer along with their buddies.

Cast 
Jeremy Sumpter as Skeet Dobson
Eric Christian Olsen as Randy Dobson
Mark Harmon as Jim Wesley
Stacy Edwards as Jessica Dobson
Giuseppe Andrews as Willy
Allison Munn as Allison
Chaka Forman as Da Cat
Lukas Behnken as Zack
Archie Kao as David Kamelamela
Shelby Fenner as Samantha

Production
The filming was began on the beaches of Los Angeles, California in 2001.

References

Review in Variety

External links

2002 films
American drama films
2002 drama films
2000s English-language films
2000s American films